Mehrili may refer to:
Mehrili, Qubadli, Azerbaijan
Mehrili, Shamkir, Azerbaijan